Park Sung-joon (born 9 June 1986) is a South Korean professional golfer.

Park played on the Japan Golf Tour, where he got one win, the 2013 Vana H Cup KBC Augusta. He ended 5th in the money list that season. In 2014 he joined the Web.com Tour. He finished 44th in the Web.com Tour Finals to earn his PGA Tour card for the 2014–15 season.

Park represented South Korea in the 2011 World Cup.

Professional wins (2)

Japan Golf Tour wins (1)

*Note: The 2013 Vana H Cup KBC Augusta was shortened to 54 holes due to rain.

Japan Golf Tour playoff record (0–1)

Japan Challenge Tour wins (1)

Results in major championships

CUT = missed the half-way cut

Team appearances
World Cup (representing South Korea): 2011

See also
2014 Web.com Tour Finals graduates

References

External links

South Korean male golfers
Japan Golf Tour golfers
PGA Tour golfers
1986 births
Living people
Korn Ferry Tour graduates